Glaucocharis bipunctella is a moth in the family Crambidae. It was described by Francis Walker in 1866. It is endemic to New Zealand.

References

Diptychophorini
Moths described in 1866
Moths of New Zealand
Endemic fauna of New Zealand
Taxa named by Francis Walker (entomologist)
Endemic moths of New Zealand